The 2002 Italian Grand Prix (formally the Gran Premio Vodafone d'Italia 2002) was a Formula One motor race held at Monza on 15 September 2002. It was the fifteenth race of the 2002 FIA Formula One World Championship.

The 53-lap race was won by Rubens Barrichello, driving a Ferrari. Teammate Michael Schumacher finished second, 0.25 seconds behind, to complete a Ferrari 1–2 on the team's home soil. Eddie Irvine finished third in a Jaguar-Cosworth, achieving both his and the Jaguar team's last F1 podium finish.

Background
Heading into the Italian Grand Prix, both the Drivers' and Constructors' Championships were already settled, with Ferrari driver Michael Schumacher having claimed the Drivers' Championship four races earlier in France, and Ferrari securing the Constructors' Championship two races later in Hungary.

After the Belgian Grand Prix on 1 September, all teams (except Arrows) conducted mid-season testing at the Autodromo Nazionale di Monza between 3–6 September to prepare for the upcoming race at the circuit. Michael Schumacher was fastest on the first day, ahead of BAR test driver Anthony Davidson which was held in wet weather conditions, with intermittent dry spells. Ralf Schumacher set the fastest times on the second where the rain continued into the morning before stopping meaning the track dried up as the session progressed. The first full day of dry weather conditions was held on the third day where Pedro de la Rosa was the fastest driver. Rubens Barrichello was the fastest driver on the final day of testing. Juan Pablo Montoya caused a red flag to be shown when he lost control of his car at the Lesmo corners, and removed his front wing after colliding with the barrier.

Due to the configuration of the Autodromo Nazionale di Monza, with its high average speed, the teams set up their cars to produce the minimum amount of downforce possible. Ferrari introduced a new qualifying-specification engine but the team installed a previous engine specification for the race on Sunday. Williams and BAR introduced revised engine specifications for the qualifying session, while Renault debuted new front wings for the race.

Practice
Four practice sessions were held before the Sunday race, two each on Friday and Saturday. The Friday morning and afternoon sessions each lasted an hour; the third and fourth sessions, on Saturday morning, lasted 45 minutes each. Conditions were sunny and dry for the Friday practice sessions.

Qualifying
Saturday's afternoon qualifying session lasted for an hour. Each driver was limited to twelve laps, with the starting order decided by the drivers' fastest laps. During this session, the 107% rule was in effect, which necessitated each driver set a time within 107% of the quickest lap to qualify for the race. The Williams and Ferrari teams chose to experiment with tyre set-ups by using hard compound tyres with the aim of gaining better race performance. His record would remain unbroken until 2018, when Kimi Räikkönen set a faster pole lap. He felt his lap time was "pretty good" and gained a large amount of time at the Lesmo corners which contributed to a fast middle sector time. Montoya was joined on the front row of the grid by Michael Schumacher who was 0.257 seconds off Montoya's pace and was happy with his lap time despite him taking time to get optimum tyre temperature. Ralf Schumacher qualified third and reported making a mistake at the Lesmo corners on his third timed run. Barrichello set his fastest lap time on his second timed run to secure fourth position. Räikkonen initially secured fifth in his McLaren but was stripped of his fastest qualifying lap as a result of a collision with Sato's Jordan at the Roggia chicane, which caused the session to be stopped temporarily; as a result, Irvine in the Jaguar was promoted to fifth with Räikkonen sixth. Coulthard took seventh in the other McLaren, with de la Rosa alongside him on the fourth row in the second Jaguar. Villeneuve took ninth in the BAR, with Salo rounding out the top ten in his Toyota.

Trulli was eleventh in the Renault, joined on the sixth row by Fisichella in the other Jordan. McNish was thirteenth in the second Toyota, followed by the two Saubers of Massa and Heidfeld. Panis was sixteenth in the second BAR, with Button seventeenth in the second Renault. Despite the incident with Räikkonen, Sato took eighteenth and said "That was the most difficult qualifying session of my career". The two Minardis lined up on the back row of the grid, Webber ahead of the returning Yoong.

Qualifying classification

 – Kimi Räikkönen's fastest time (1:21.163) was cancelled following a collision with Takuma Sato during qualifying, this dropped him one place from fifth to sixth.

Race
The race started at 14:00 local time. Ralf Schumacher switched to the spare Williams because his regular car developed a fuel pressure problem. At the start, Montoya drove to the right to block Michael Schumacher, allowing teammate Ralf Schumacher to run alongside him heading into the Rettifilo chicane. Montoya ran wide to prevent a collision with Ralf, who drove over the chicane and thus took the lead illegally. Williams contacted FIA race director Charlie Whiting who replied that Ralf was required to cede the lead back to Montoya. McNish made the best start in the field, moving from thirteenth to seventh by the end of the first lap, while Panis made up four positions over the same distance. At the end of the first lap, the order of the top ten drivers was Ralf Schumacher, Montoya, Barrichello, Michael Schumacher, Räikkönen, Irvine, McNish, Salo, Panis and Villeneuve.

Ralf Schumacher began to pull away from Montoya. Further down the field Villeneuve got ahead of Heidfeld to take over tenth, while Button passed Massa to move into thirteenth position and Yoong overtook teammate Webber for eighteenth. Ralf Schumacher set a new fastest lap, a 1:26.230 on lap three, but was later eclipsed by Barrichello. Villeneuve was overtaken by Trulli on the same lap and Webber reclaimed eighteenth from Yoong. Williams received a reply to order Ralf Schumacher to cede first position to Montoya which was relayed to Schumacher by the Senior Operations Engineer of Williams Sam Michael at the end of lap four. Afterwards Ralf Schumacher pulled over to the side of the track at the Rettifilo with smoke billowing from his engine and became the first retirement of the race at the start of lap five. His teammate Montoya thus temporarily inherited the lead but was blinded by the smoke, allowing Barrichello to move into the inside line, and after running in Montoya's slipstream, he passed the Williams driver for the lead under braking going into the Rettifilo. On lap fifteen Felipe Massa and Pedro de la Rosa collided at the Ascari chicane. In accordance with the new regulations that season, Massa became the first driver to receive a 10-place grid penalty for causing a collision. Kimi Räikkönen retired during the 30th lap due to engine failure, for the fifth time of the season.

Felipe Massa also became the first driver to wear the HANS device during a Formula One race.

Race classification

Championship standings after the race 
Bold text indicates the World Champions.

Drivers' Championship standings

Constructors' Championship standings

References

Italian Grand Prix
Italian Grand Prix
Grand Prix
Italian Grand Prix